Eumicrotremus taranetzi is a species of lumpfish native to the Northwest Pacific. It is known from the Bering Sea, the Kuril Islands, the Sea of Okhotsk, and the Sea of Japan. It is a small demersal fish that reaches 5.9 cm (2.3 in) SL.

References 

Fish of the North Pacific
taranetzi
Fish described in 1936